Andrew Thomas Smillie (born 15 March 1941) is an English former professional footballer who played as an inside forward.

Smillie was born in Ilford and played for Ilford, London and England Schoolboys. He joined the groundstaff at West Ham United in 1956 and gained three England Youth caps before signing professional forms with the Irons in 1958. After a senior debut against Southend United in the Southern Floodlight Cup on 10 March 1958, he made his First Division bow on 26 December 1958 against Tottenham Hotspur. In all, Smillie played 26 games for West Ham, leaving in 1961.

Smillie went on to play League football for Crystal Palace, Scunthorpe United, Southend United and Gillingham, before joining Folkestone Town in 1971. He later played for Ferndale.

References

External links

1941 births
Living people
Footballers from Ilford
English footballers
England youth international footballers
Gillingham F.C. players
West Ham United F.C. players
Crystal Palace F.C. players
Southend United F.C. players
Scunthorpe United F.C. players
English Football League players
Association football inside forwards
Folkestone F.C. players